Krishnakumar Natarajan is one of the co-founders of IT company Mindtree, and was until recently the Executive Chairman of the company. He is currently Managing Partner at Mela Ventures, an early stage venture capital fund in India. He was appointed as the Chairman of NASSCOM for the year 2013–2014. He was earlier a senior executive with Wipro and is an alumnus of XLRI.

Early life and education
KK graduated in 1979 with a degree in Mechanical Engineering from the College of Engineering, Guindy, Chennai, India. In 1981, he completed his Master's in Business Administration (MBA) majoring in marketing and systems from XLRI, Jamshedpur, India.

Career
KK started his career in Wipro and held various key positions there from 1982 to 1999. During this time, he started and grew the Ecommerce division as the Chief Executive of the Ecommerce and Financial Solutions Division from 1996 to 1999. He served as Group Vice President of Human Resources and also as Chief Marketing Officer for Wipro's IT business. .

In August 1999, KK along with nine other businessmen in IT, co-founded Mindtree. In the early years of Mindtree, KK was instrumental in setting up the U.S. operations and played a key role in building the organization. He then drove Mindtree's expansion into Europe, Asia Pacific and the Middle East, transforming Mindtree's IT services business. He was until recently the Executive Chairman of Mindtree, until its acquisition by L&T Infotech.

KK is an Ex-Chairman of NASSCOM and chaired the ‘emerging companies’ forum. In this capacity, he worked towards bringing together large and emerging companies to make the Indian IT industry a globally competitive ecosystem.

KK is an active member of several professional industry organizations, such as the Manufacturer's Association for Information Technology (MAIT) and the Confederation of Indian Industry (CII).

Awards and recognition
KK was ranked number 28 on the 50 highest rated CEOs list published by Glassdoor, 2013.

Personal life and family
KK is married to Akila Krishnakumar.

References

Living people
Indian chief executives
XLRI – Xavier School of Management alumni
Year of birth missing (living people)